The Indian River is a  long brackish lagoon in Florida. It is part of the Indian River Lagoon system, which in turn forms part of the Atlantic Intracoastal Waterway. It was originally named Rio de Ais after the Ais Indian tribe, who lived along the east coast of Florida, but was later given its current name.

The Indian River extends southward from the Ponce de Leon inlet in New Smyrna Beach in Volusia County southward and across the Haulover Canal and along the western shore of Merritt Island. The Banana River flows into the Indian River on the island's south side. The Indian River continues southward to St. Lucie Inlet. At certain seasons of the year, bridges have tended to impede the flow of gracilaria (a red algae), resulting in an odor of hydrogen sulfide in the area.

Tributaries and estuaries
Tributaries of the Indian River include the Merritt Island Barge Canal (man-made), the C-54 Canal (man-made), Crane Creek, the Eau Gallie River, Horse Creek, Mullet Creek, St. Sebastian River, St. Lucie River, Sykes Creek, and Turkey Creek. An estuary of Indian River is Palm Bay. The St. Johns-Indian River Barge Canal was proposed in the 1960s to provide a water link to the St. Johns River, but was cancelled in the early 1970s.

References

External links

An early 20th Century description of the Indian River
Hernandez Trail History

Lagoons of Florida
 
Rivers of Brevard County, Florida
Bodies of water of Indian River County, Florida
Rivers of Volusia County, Florida